The Three Sovereigns and Five Emperors were a group of mythological rulers and deities from ancient China, today considered culture heroes. According to received history, this period preceded the Xia Dynasty.

In myth, the Three Sovereigns were demigods who used their abilities to help create mankind and impart to them essential skills and knowledge. The Five Emperors were exemplary sages who possessed great moral character.

Variations 

Depending on the source, there are many variations of who classifies as the Three Sovereigns or the Five Emperors.  There are six to seven known variations.  Many of the sources listed below were written from much later dynasties.

The following appear in different groupings of the Three Sovereigns: Fuxi (伏羲), Nüwa (女媧), Shennong (神農), Suiren (燧人), Zhurong (祝融), Gong Gong (共工), Heavenly Sovereign (天皇), Earthly Sovereign (地皇), Tai Sovereign (泰皇), Human Sovereign (人皇),  and even the Yellow Emperor (黄帝).

The following appear in different groupings of the Five Emperors:  Yellow Emperor (黃帝), Zhuanxu (顓頊), Emperor Ku (嚳), Emperor Yao (堯), Shun (舜), Shaohao (少昊), Taihao (太昊), and Yan Emperor (炎帝).

Three Sovereigns
The Three Sovereigns, sometimes known as the Three August Ones, were said to be god-kings or demigods who used their magical powers to improve the lives of their people. Because of their lofty virtue, they lived to a great age and ruled over a period of great peace.  The Three Sovereigns are ascribed various identities in different Chinese historical texts.  The Yellow Emperor is supposedly the ancestor of the Huaxia people. The Mausoleum of the Yellow Emperor was established in Shaanxi Province to commemorate the ancestry legend.

Five Emperors

Family tree of ancient Five Emperors

Creation myth 

Chinese creation myths generally include Pangu.  It is said that after his death his left eye became the sun, while the right eye became the moon.  Different parts of his body became the world.  There is also the legend of the Four shi (四氏) who took part in creating the world.  The four members are Youchao-shi (有巢氏), Suiren-shi (燧人氏), Fu Xi-shi (伏羲氏), and Shennong-shi (神農氏).

Legacy 

These kings are said to have helped introduce the use of fire, taught people how to build houses and invented farming. The Yellow Emperor's wife is credited with the invention of silk culture.  The discovery of medicine, the invention of the calendar and Chinese script are also credited to the kings.  After their era, Yu the Great founded the Xia Dynasty.

Gallery

See also 
List of Neolithic cultures of China
Emperor of China

References

Further reading

External links 
History of China

History of ancient China
Chinese mythology
Legendary monarchs
3rd millennium BC